Bob Sicinski (born November 13, 1946 in Brampton, Ontario) is a retired professional ice hockey player who played 353 games in the World Hockey Association.  He played with the Chicago Cougars and Indianapolis Racers.

External links

1946 births
Canadian ice hockey centres
Chicago Cougars players
Greensboro Generals (EHL) players
Indianapolis Racers players
Living people
San Diego Mariners (PHL) players
Sportspeople from Brampton
Ice hockey people from Ontario
20th-century Canadian people